Kelda may refer to:

Kelda Group, a British utilities company
Kelda Holmes, a British actress
Kelda Roys, Wisconsin politician
A queen of a tribe of Nac Mac Feegle, a fictional race featured in Terry Pratchett's Discworld novels.
Kelda (comics), a fictional character in the Marvel Comics comic book, Thor.